Bielawski (feminine: Bielawska; plural: Bielawscy) is the surname of a Polish noble family originating from Bielawa, Masovian Voivodeship. The family bore the Jelita coat of arms. The same family confirmed nobility in the Russian Empire in Vilnius (Wilno), where it used the Jastrzębiec coat of arms. In Russia this surname is transliterated as Belyavsky (masculine) or Belyavskaya (feminine).

People 
Aleksandr Belyavsky (disambiguation) – several people
Christopher Bielawski (born 1973), researcher in synthesis and polymer chemistry
David Belyavskiy (born 1992), Russian artistic gymnast
 Edmund Bielawski, Polish-Brazilian explorer
 Józef Bielawski (1910–1997), Polish Arabist
 Maciej Zaremba Bielawski (born 1951), Polish-Swedish journalist and author
Sergey Belyavsky (1883–1953), Russian astronomer

Other 
 Mount Bielawski in California

Polish-language surnames